Unión Deportiva Huesca was a Spanish football club based in Huesca, in the autonomous community of Aragon.

History
Founded in 1929 as CD Oscense, the club changed its name to CD Huesca in 1931 and played two seasons in Tercera División before the Spanish Civil War. In 1940, after a merger with CD Español, the club was named UD Huesca.

After seven seasons in Tercera, UD Huesca achieved promotion to Segunda División in 1950. After three seasons in the category, the club suffered relegation and subsequently folded in 1956.

Another club from the same city, SD Huesca, took UD Huesca's colours.

Season to season
As CD Huesca

As UD Huesca

3 seasons in Segunda División
12 seasons in Tercera División

External links
BDFutbol team profile
ArefePedia team profile 

Defunct football clubs in Aragon
Association football clubs established in 1929
Association football clubs disestablished in 1956
1929 establishments in Spain
1956 disestablishments in Spain
Sport in Huesca
Segunda División clubs